Alian (also Romanized as ʿAlīān) is a village in Azimiyeh Rural District, in the Central District of Ray County, Tehran Province, Iran. At the 2006 census, its population was 271, in 65 families.

References 

Populated places in Ray County, Iran